The Saudi Arabian Air Defense Forces or officially Royal Saudi Air Defense Forces (RSADF) is the aerial defense service branch of the Saudi Arabian Armed Forces. It is fourth of the five service branches of the MOD. It has its HQ in Riyadh, where there is also an elaborate underground command facility that co-ordinates the Arabian Kingdom's advanced "Peace Shield" radar and air defense system, with an estimated 40,000 active duty military personnel in 2015. Along with the Royal Saudi Air Force (RSAF), it has responsibility for securing the skies of Saudi Arabia.

Overview

Towards the end of the 1970s, a paradigm shift occurred with the SAAF with the making of the RSAD Corps as a separate and equivalent service, equal to the Army, Navy, and Air Forces. It is no longer subordinate to the RSLF. The impetus behind this shift is the ever-changing threat. The concern by the Kingdom of proliferation of weapons of mass destruction and their mechanism of delivery, resulted in the early understanding by the MoD of the requirement to transform, and thus the creation of the RSADF.

Between 2017 and 2020, the RSAF claimed the interception of 311 cruise missiles and 343 suicide drones but failed to stop all the attacks against the strategic Saudi sites of the Houthi movement and Iran.

Peace Shield

 Remote-controlled air/ground radio communications sites.
 17 Lockheed Martin AN/FPS-117 long-range phased array, 3-dimensional air search radar.
 6 Northrop-Grumman AN/TPS-43 portable 3-dimensional tactical air search radar.
 Raytheon Improved HAWK air defense missile system.
 Raytheon MIM-104 Patriot air defense missile system
 Oerlikon Contraves Skyguard 35mm Twin Cannon Short Range air defense system
 Lockheed Martin THAAD anti-ballistic missile defense system.
Source:

Past Inventory

See also
 Royal Saudi Strategic Missile Force

Notes

References

External links

 R.S. Air Defense  official website
 Moqatel (Warrior Desert)

Air defense
Aerial warfare
Air defence units and formations
Military units and formations established in 1930
1930 establishments in Saudi Arabia
Anti-aircraft warfare
Air defence forces